The 2019 Nigerian House of Representatives elections in Abia State was held on February 23, 2019, to elect members of the House of Representatives to represent Abia State, Nigeria.

Overview

Summary

Results

Aba North/Aba South 
A total of 10 candidates registered with the Uzo Independent National Electoral Commission to contest in the election. APGA candidate Ossy Prestige won the election, defeating PDP Uzo Azubuike and 8 other party candidates. Prestige received 54.43% of the votes, while Azubuike received 34.25%.

Arochukwu/Ohafia 
A total of 16 candidates registered with the Independent National Electoral Commission to contest in the election. PDP candidate Uko Nkole won the election, defeating APC Nnamdi Iro Orji and 14 other candidates. Nkole received 34.67% of the votes, while Oji received 33.30%.

Bende 
A total of 11 candidates registered with the Independent National Electoral Commission to contest in the election. APC candidate Benjamin Kalu won the election, defeating PDP Anyaso Chimobi Desmond and 9 other party candidates. Kalu received 51.78% of the votes, while Desmond received 31.62%.

Isiala Ngwa North/Isiala Ngwa South 
A total of 13 candidates registered with the Independent National Electoral Commission to contest in the election. PDP candidate Darlington Nwokocha won the election, defeating APC Blessing Uwaoma Nwokonneya and 11 other candidates. Nwokocha received 60% of the votes, while Nwokonneya received 20.1%.

Isuikwuato/Umunneochi 
A total of 14 candidates registered with the Independent National Electoral Commission to contest in the election. APC candidate Nkeiruka Onyejeocha won the election, defeating PDP Jude Udeachara and 12 other candidates. Lado received 52.19% of the votes, while Iyah received 37.42%.

Obingwa/Ugwunagbo/Osisioma 
A total of 14 candidates registered with the Independent National Electoral Commission to contest in the election. PDP candidate Solomon Adaelu won the election, defeating APGA Nwamgwa Charles Lawrence and 12 other party candidates. Adaelu received 76.51% of the votes, while Lawrence received 11.41%.

Ukwa East/West 
A total of 15 candidates registered with the Independent National Electoral Commission to contest in the election. PDP candidate Uzoma Nkem-Abonta won the election, defeating APGA Nwoloki Lucy Eze and 13 other party candidate. Nkem-Abonta received 43.41% of the votes, while Eze received 27.80%.

Umuahia North/South/Ikwuano 
A total of 12 candidates registered with the Independent National Electoral Commission to contest in the election. PDP candidate Samuel Onuigbo won the election, defeating APC Apugo Martin Ikechukwu and 10 other candidates. Onuigbo received 46.04% of the votes, while Ikechukwu received 34.95%.

References 

Abia State House of Representatives elections
House of Representatives
Abia
February 2019 events in Nigeria